Seathwaite is a village in the Duddon Valley in the South Lakeland district of Cumbria in North West England. Historically in Lancashire, it lies within the Lake District National Park, and is part of the civil parish of Dunnerdale-with-Seathwaite, which has a population of 129.  The nearby Seathwaite Tarn, west of the Coniston Fells, takes its
name from the village. The village is north east of Hall Dunnerdale and south west of the tarn. It lies along the old Walna Scar road, which can be reached from the A595 in the south, or from the steep Hardknott–Wrynose pass road in the north, which leads off the 
A593 from Skelwith Bridge).

The name Seathwaite derives from a combination of the old Norse words
sef (sedges) and thveit (clearing) and may be taken to mean "Sedges clearing".
The name, then spelled Seuthwayt, first appeared in written records dating from 1340.

A local landmark is the Newfield Inn, a pub that dates from the 16th century that is reputed to have been visited by William Wordsworth on his trips around the Lake District in the early 19th century. Another prominent local building is the Church of the Holy Trinity which was originally built in the early 16th century. William Wordsworth visited the church and dedicated one of his 35 Duddon Sonnets to the place and to Robert Walker (1709–1802) who was parson at the church for 66 years. The church contains a memorial plaque to Walker, who was known as "Wonderful Walker" because of his long and exemplary ministry. Wordsworth refers to him in the sonnet as someone "whose good works formed an endless retinue". The church itself was completely rebuilt in 1874 due to its rundown state, it was reconsecrated in May 1875.

See also

Listed buildings in Dunnerdale-with-Seathwaite
 Cumbrian placename etymology

References 

Villages in Cumbria
South Lakeland District